Ileostylus micranthus is a mistletoe native to New Zealand and the Norfolk Islands. In New Zealand it is also known by its Māori name Pirita.

References

Loranthaceae
Flora of New Zealand